Ethan Ennis (born 11 December 2004) is an English professional footballer who plays as a winger for Manchester United.

Club career
Ennis started his youth career at Liverpool and began rising through the ranks. However, on 17 August 2021, he moved to rivals Manchester United after rejecting a new contract, becoming the first player in 57 years to do so. He also had interest from Chelsea at the time of the move.

The Guardian later included Ennis in their list of best talents at each Premier League club.

Ennis signed his first professional contract on 24 December 2021, two weeks after his 17th birthday.

Style of play
Ennis has been described as having "brilliant quality on the ball", "an eye for a creative pass", and "brilliant instincts in front of goal". He has also been called, 'two-footed, commanding in the air, and jet-heeled'.

Honours
Manchester United U18
FA Youth Cup: 2021–22

References

Living people
2004 births
English footballers
Association football wingers